Vladimir Petrovich Politov (born December 6, 1970, in Batagai, Sakha (Yakutia) Republic, USSR) is a Russian singer who rose to popularity as member of legendary Russian music band Na-Na.

Career 
1990 – present – World known performer in Russian band Na-Na
2004 – current – DJ  PS Project

In 2000 he signed a contract with Dick Clark Productions.

Personal life 
Vladimir was married to Olga Politova from 1999 until their divorce in 2006, together they have daughter Aliona (born in 2000), whom Vladimir raised by himself as a single father for many years.

References

External links 
Vladimir Politov's Official website
Na-Na Official Youtube channel
Vladimir Politov Youtube channel
Vladimir Politov on Twitter
 

1970 births
Living people
People from the Sakha Republic
20th-century Russian singers
21st-century Russian singers
20th-century Russian male singers
21st-century Russian male singers
Honored Artists of the Russian Federation